Paleo-European (Palaeo-European) may refer to:
in geology, the remote geological history of Europe
in archaeology, the deep Prehistory of Europe
Paleolithic Europe
Mesolithic Europe
Neolithic Europe
the proposed Old European culture
in historical linguistics, the Paleo-European languages are the pre-Indo-European and sometimes pre-Finno-Ugric (pre-Sami) languages of Europe
the suggested Macro-Caucasian language group (John Bengtson 2008) 
in scientific racism, Paleo-Europeans a supposed racial type native to Europe proper